The Portuguese arrived in the Kingdom of Kotte in 1505. By 1594 they had appointed a captain-general to control the Portuguese occupied territory called Portuguese Ceylon on the island of modern-day Sri Lanka. In that time, there were numerous captain-generals until 1658. The post of captain-general was preceded by that of the captain-major in 1551 and before that by the captain in 1518.

List of governors

See also
 List of monarchs of Sri Lanka
 List of captains of Portuguese Ceylon
 List of captain-majors of Portuguese Ceylon
 History of Sri Lanka

References
 List of heads of state of Sri Lanka at worldstatesmen.org

Ceilão
Ceilão
Ceilão
Governors of Portuguese Ceylon
Ceylon
1594 establishments in Asia
16th-century establishments in Sri Lanka
1658 disestablishments in Asia
17th-century disestablishments in Sri Lanka

pt:Anexo:Lista de governadores portugueses do Ceilão